The Treasure Island Development is a  major redevelopment project under construction on Treasure Island and parts of Yerba Buena Island in San Francisco Bay between San Francisco and Oakland, within San Francisco city limits. The Treasure Island Development Authority (TIDA) is a nonprofit organization formed to oversee the economic development of the former naval station. Treasure Island's development was set to break ground during mid-2012. However, on April 12, 2013, The San Francisco Chronicle reported that the deal has collapsed, with the Chinese investors from China Development Bank and China Railway Construction Corporation withdrawing from the project. The Treasure Island Project is being developed by a joint venture between Lennar and Kenwood Investments. The development is expected to cost .

Treasure Island Development Authority
The Treasure Island Development Authority (TIDA) is a nonprofit organization city agency that oversees the economic development of Treasure Island. The Authority has a seven-member Board of Directors who were appointed by the former Mayor of San Francisco, Ed Lee. The Board of Directors oversees the goal of reusing the island in an environmentally and economically viable way, as well as creating and minting the master development plan. The current members of TIDA are:

TIDA strives to achieve success in the following goals: "Leadership in Sustainability, Establishing a Regional Destination, Unique San Francisco Neighborhood, Creating Community Benefits/ Job Opportunities"

Master plan 
The master plan calls for all residences to be within a 10-minute walk of all basic goods. A new ferry terminal would connect to a retail center as part of an urban core with a 40-story tower and hotels. Three distinct residential neighborhoods would radiate from the core area and feature townhouses, along with flats and a 14-story residential tower. Also proposed are five high-rise towers, a K-8 school,  of retail and commercial buildings, a  park, a  organic farm, and a 400-ship marina and beach along with state-of-the-art community facilities. The entire redevelopment would take 20 to 30 years to build and would create 8,000 new households for approximately 20,000 people. The development is expected to cost .

Buildings in the development

Project status 
The City of San Francisco and the former San Francisco Redevelopment Agency had planned to redevelop the  island since 1997, when the United States Navy closed its base on the island. The Treasure Island Project is being developed by a joint venture between Lennar and Kenwood Investments. 

On June 7, 2011, the San Francisco Board of Supervisors voted 11-0 to approve the project. The project would create 3,000 permanent jobs, and 2,000 construction jobs. Treasure and Yerba Island are home to 1,800 residents, who have access to a commercial area, restaurants, schools, community organizations, event venues, sporting clubs and athletic leagues. Construction of the large development started in March 2016.

Criticisms
Critics of the project say the island's soil might be toxic because it is a former Navy base. In 2014, Navy contractors dug a small radioactive fragment out of the soil on the island. The land is prone to subsidence and liquefaction in event of an earthquake.

After the city of San Francisco initially approved the project in 2011, a group called "Citizens for a Sustainable Treasure Island", led by then-former city supervisor Aaron Peskin, filed a lawsuit against the city and the developer, out of concern that the project's impact on environment and traffic had not been properly reviewed. The courts rejected the complaint, with the California Supreme Court declining an appeal in October 2014.

See also

 New Urbanism
 Smart Growth
 San Francisco Transbay development
 San Francisco Redevelopment Agency

References

External links and further reading
 Treasure Island official website at the City and County of San Francisco
 Information about the development from the SF Office of Economic and Workforce Development
 "Plan for Treasure Island Clears Hurdle, but Serious Issues Remain" article by Zusha Elinson in The New York Times April 23, 2011
 Through two mayors, connected island developers cultivated profitable deal  Public Press 2010
 Specter of conflict of interest for Newsom / Developer, fund-raiser seeks Treasure Island deal  SFGate 2004
 Treasure Island Trouble Has Grand Jury Writing Mad / Report takes special slam at S.F. mayor  SFGATE 1998

Skyscrapers in San Francisco
Skidmore, Owings & Merrill buildings
Treasure Island, San Francisco
Proposed buildings and structures in California